The drangùe is a semi-human winged divine figure in Albanian mythology and folklore, associated with weather and storms. Babies destined to become drangue are born with their heads covered in caul and with two or sometimes four wings under their arms. The drangue hold supernatural powers, especially in the wings and arms. He is made invulnerable by the singular conjunction produced at his birth, and can die only if this conjunction is repeated once again. The main goal of the drangue is to fight the kulshedra in legendary battles. He uses meteoric stones, lightning-swords, thunderbolts, piles of trees and rocks to defeat the kulshedra and to protect mankind from storms, fire, floods and other natural disasters caused by her destructive power. Heavy thunderstorms are thought to be the result of their battles. The drangue and their myth are extensively and accurately portrayed in the Albanian folk tale "The Boy who was Brother to the Drague".

Name and etymology
Standard Albanian form of the name is dragùa (def. dragói). A common dialectal variant is drangue. Durham recorded the form drangoni.

The Albanian term drangùe/dragùa is related to drangë, drëngë, drëngëzë, "a small fresh-water fish that does not grow very big", and to Gheg Albanian drãng, "kitten, puppy, cub", generally used for a "wild baby animal", most likely related to the singular birth conditions of this mythological figure. In Albanian tradition, there are two semantic features of the term dragùa. Some of the earliest Albanian works includes the term dragùa to describe a dragon or hydra-like monster, such as found in Roman mythology and in Balkan folklore. With the same meaning other old sources use instead the term kulshedra. The other semantic sense of the term dragùa, which is widespread in collective Albanian beliefs, is that of a hero battling the Kulshedra, a mythological tradition already attested in the 17th century Albanian texts, such as the 1635 Dictionarium Latino-Epiroticum by Frang Bardhi. The term drangue is also used in some Albanian dialects (including also the Arbëresh) with the meaning of "lion" and "noble animal".

Origin of the myth
The legendary battle of a heroic deity associated with thunder and weather, like drangue, who fights and slays a huge multi-headed serpent associated with water and storms, like kulshedra, has been preserved from a common motif of Indo-European mythology. Similar characters with different names but same motifs representing the dichotomy of "good and evil" – mainly reflected by the protection of the community from storms – are found also in the folklore of other Balkan peoples.

Birth
Babies destined to become dragùa are born "wearing shirts" and qeleshes, with two or four wings under their arms. This notion that the predestined hero are born "in a chemise" does not refer to them literally wearing articles of clothing; rather, these are babies born with their heads covered in caul, or amniotic membrane.

In some regions (such as Celza parish), it is said that dragùa babies are only born to parents whose lineage have not committed adultery for three generations, or from mothers who were kulshedras.

Appearance and attributes 
The drangues are semi-human warriors with extraordinary strength, giving them the ability to tear trees out of the ground and throw large boulders at their enemies. They can also cast lightning bolts and meteors, or whole houses.

The wings and arms of a dragùa are thought to be the source of his power and if their bodies are dissected, a golden heart with a jewel in the middle of it will be found.

As warrior fighting the kulshedra, he is armed with the "beam of the plow and the plow-share", or a "pitchfork and the post from the threshing floor, and with the big millstones". He also employs his cradle as a shield to parry blows from the kulshedra.

These heroes may live unnoticed among humans and are thought to be "invulnerable, untouchable, and undefeatable". They have "supernatural powers which become apparent while they are still babies in their cradles. When thunder and lightning strike Dragùas assemble with their cradles at the Dragùa gathering place".

In southeastern Albanian regions of Pogradec and Korça, the dragùa is "envisaged.. as a beautiful strong horse with wings, who defends civilization and mankind".

"Male animals can also be born as dragùas. Black rams will attack a Kulshedra with their horns, and black roosters will furiously pick out its eyes. Only billy goats can never be dragùas".

Battle with kulshedra

Thunderstorms are conceived as battles between the drangues and the kulshedras, the roll of thunder taken to be the sounds of their weapons clashing. This shares many similarities with chaoskampf, a mythological trope of the Proto-Indo-European religion, where a Storm God battles a many-headed Sea Serpent. Drangues are believed to perpetually battle with the Kulshedra. Or he is said to have slain her for good, having knocked her unconscious by throwing trees and boulders at her, and afterwards drowning her in the Shkumbin River, according to the localized lore of central Albania.

In the Highland Lute
In the Lahuta e Malcís (English: Highland Lute)—one of the most important heroic epics of Albania—the drangues are presented as the personification of the Albanian Highlands heroes, and are the central figures of the 16th and 17th cantos. In the 16th canto a kulshedra escapes from a cave in Shalë to take revenge on Vocerr Bala, a drangue. A force of drangues gather and defeat the kulshedra. After the battle they are invited by oras, female protective spirits, to celebrate their victory.

In the 17th canto the central figures are two drangues named Rrustem Uka and Xhem Sadrija. After preparing for a wedding ceremony, they travel to Qafë Hardhi (English: Grapevine Pass) to rest. While cleaning their weapons and smoking, they discover that eight Montenegrin battalions, consisting of three hundred soldiers led by Mark Milani, are marching against Plava and Gucia. The two drangues, with the help of local shepherds, defend Qafë Hardhi and force the Montenegrins to retreat at Sutjeska.

Modern beliefs 
The belief that a dragùa can be born every day has persisted among Albanian mountain folk until recently, and there are still elderly people alive who espouse the belief.

In Malësia, a region in northern Albania and southern Montenegro inhabited mostly by Albanians, the locals believe that the drangues exist and live among them.

Syncretism in Albanian folklore

In Albanian folklore, Saint George and Saint Elias (also identified with the Old Testament prophet Elijah, possibly due to confusion with the Greek “Helios” as a translation of Late Ancient deity Sol Invictus) both have stories in which they fight (and defeat) a Bolla/Kulshedra. Saint Elias, in particular, is identified in some regions with the Dragùa and is also a weather god and provides protection against storms and fire.

See also 
Albanian mythology
Zana e Malit
Shurdh
Verbt
Perëndi
Zojz (deity)

Sources

Citations

Bibliography

 
 
 
 
 

 
 
 
 
 
 
 
 

 

Albanian legendary creatures